is a Japanese short track speed skater. He competed at the 1998 Winter Olympics and the 2002 Winter Olympics.

External links
Takehiro Kodera at ISU

References

1978 births
Living people
Japanese male short track speed skaters
Olympic short track speed skaters of Japan
Short track speed skaters at the 1998 Winter Olympics
Short track speed skaters at the 2002 Winter Olympics
Sportspeople from Aichi Prefecture
Asian Games medalists in short track speed skating
Short track speed skaters at the 1999 Asian Winter Games
Medalists at the 1999 Asian Winter Games
Asian Games silver medalists for Japan